Retribution may refer to:

 Punishment
 Retributive justice, a theory of justice
 Divine retribution, retributive justice in a religious context
 Revenge, a harmful action against a person or group in response to a grievance

Film and television

Films
 Retribution (1921 film), an Australian silent film by Armand Lionello
 Retribution (1969 film), a Soviet drama film by Aleksandr Stolper
 Retribution (1987 film), an American horror film by Guy Magar
 Retribution (2000 film) or Complicity, a UK film based on a novel by Iain Banks
 Retribution (2002 film), a British television film in the Hornblower series
 Retribution (2006 film), a Japanese horror film by Kiyoshi Kurosawa
 Retribution (2015 film), a Spanish thriller film by Dani de la Torre
 Retribution (upcoming film), an American thriller film by Nimród Antal
 Resident Evil: Retribution, a 2012 film, the fifth in the Resident Evil series

Television
 Retribution (TV series), or One of Us, a 2016 British drama miniseries
 "Retribution" (Captain Power and the Soldiers of the Future), a 1988 two-part episode
 "Retribution", a 1994 episode of BattleTech: The Animated Series

Literature
 Retribution (Hoffman novel), a 2004 novel by Jilliane Hoffman
 Retribution (play), an 1818 play by John Dillon
 Retribution (Southworth novel), an 1849 novel by E. D. E. N. Southworth
 "Retribution", an 1846 poem by Henry Wadsworth Longfellow; see Mills of God
 Retribution, a 2007 novel in the Warhammer Von Carstein trilogy by Steven Savile
 Retribution, a 2007 Dreamland novel by Jim DeFelice and Dale Brown
 Mass Effect: Retribution, a 2010 novel by Drew Karpyshyn

Music

Albums
 Retribution (Malevolent Creation album), 1992
 Retribution (Nightingale album), 2014
 Retribution (Obscura album), 2006
 Retribution (Shadows Fall album), 2009
 Retribution (Tanya Tagaq album) or the title song, 2016
 Retribution, by Ektomorf, 2014

Songs
 "Retribution", by Fantom Warior, 2012
 "Retribution", by Thunder from Bang!, 2008

Video games
 Retribution (video game), a 1994 first-person shooter computer game
 Eve Online: Retribution, a 2012 expansion of the MMO Eve Online
 Resistance: Retribution, a PSP game in the Resistance series
 StarCraft: Retribution, a 1998 authorised add-on for the game StarCraft
 Warhammer 40,000: Dawn of War II – Retribution, a 2011 stand-alone expansion pack for the game Warhammer 40,000: Dawn of War II

Other uses
 Retribution (professional wrestling), a professional wrestling stable

See also
Avenger (disambiguation)
Reprisal, in warfare, a permissible act of retaliation
Reprisal (novel), a novel in The Adversary Cycle by F. Paul Wilson
Retaliation (disambiguation)
Retorsion, in international law, an act of retaliation by one nation upon another
Revenge (disambiguation)
Vengeance (disambiguation)